The Diocese of Down and Connor, is a Latin Church ecclesiastical territory or diocese of the Catholic Church in Northern Ireland. It is one of eight suffragan dioceses in the ecclesiastical province of the metropolitan Archdiocese of Armagh. The See is vacant; Bishop Donal McKeown (Bishop of Derry) is currently the Apostolic Administrator pending the appointment of a new bishop.

Territorial remit
The territorial remit of the diocese includes much of counties Antrim and Down, including the cities of Belfast and Lisburn and the large towns Antrim, Ballymena, Bangor, Carrickfergus, Downpatrick, Holywood, Larne and Newtownards. The population of the diocese is about one million, of which approximately 30% are Roman Catholic with Sunday mass attendance estimated at 20%. There are currently 88 parishes and ministries in the diocese served by fewer than 100 priests, though the significance of individual parishes has been overtaken by the development of 'pastoral communities'. The diocese is Ireland's second largest in terms of population (after the Archdiocese of Dublin).

History
St Fergus (died 583) is named as first Bishop of Down. The Diocese of Connor was founded in 480 by St Macnissi, and St Malachy was bishop there (1124). The dioceses of Down and Connor were permanently joined in 1439.

In 1670, as an effect of the Reformation, wars, and penal laws, in the whole of Down and Connor there were only 2,500 Catholic families. When at length the pressure of penal legislation was removed Catholicism revived rapidly.

In the period 1810–1840, a period of relaxation of the penal laws culminating in Catholic Emancipation, an estimated forty new churches were built. The progress thus made under Dr Crolly (1825–1835) and Dr Denvir (1835–65) was continued, as Belfast expanded as a city, under Dr Dorrian (1865–86) and Dr MacAlister (1886–95) and Dr Henry (1895–1908).

Current episcopate 
Noel Treanor was the 32nd Bishop of Down and Connor. He was ordained to the episcopate and installed as Bishop of Down and Connor on 29 June 2008. His successor has yet to be named by the Holy See.

Priests in Down and Connor serve in parish ministry, school chaplaincy, hospital chaplaincy, youth work, prison chaplaincy, teacher training colleges and teach in post-primary schools.

At the Diocesan Congress in 2013 Bishop Treanor launched a review to ensure pastoral activities within the diocese matched current resources. To that end a review of pastoral structures was initiated which drew on the 2011 census.  Draft new pastoral communities were presented to the clergy in three meetings and then to the lay faithful. Significantly influencing the structures for the future was a regular practice rate across the diocese of 20% which suggested a greater sharing of personnel, skills and finances.

In October 2018, Bishop Treanor ordained the first permanent deacons for service in the diocese.

Diocesan statistics
 Number of Catholics = 329,243
 Number of parishes = 88
 Number of churches = 151
 Number of priests in diocesan ministry = 131
 Number of permanent deacons in ministry (2018) = 9
 Number ordained (2018) = 1
 Number of retired priests = 44
 Seminarians = 16
 Number of brothers = 30
 Number of sisters = 243
 St. Mary's College of Education on roll = 994
 Number of primary & nursery schools = 164 (on roll = 32,306)
 Number of grammar schools = 12 (on roll = 10,795)
 Number of secondary school = 31 (on roll = 15,621)
 Baptisms = 5,078
 First communions = 4,533
 Confirmations = 4,730
 Marriages = 1,250

(The Down and Connor Directory)

City parishes
Listed are city parishes listed by the Diocese of Down and Connor.

 St Peter's Cathedral, Belfast
 St Patrick's Church, Belfast / Pro-Cathedral, Donegall Street, Belfast
 Christ the Redeemer, Lagmore
 Corpus Christi, Ballymurphy, Belfast
 St. Patrick's, Derriaghy
 Drumbo & Carryduff
 Hannahstown
 Holy Cross, Ardoyne
 Holy Family, Newington
 Holy Rosary, Ormeau Road
 Holy Trinity, Turf Lodge
 Loughshore - Three parishes: St Mary’s Greencastle, County Antrim, Star of The Sea Whitehouse, County Antrim and St James’, Whiteabbey
 Nativity, Poleglass
 Our Lady Queen of Peace, Kilwee
 Sacred Heart, Glenview Street, Oldpark Road, Belfast
 St Agnes', Andersonstown Road, Belfast
 St Anne's, Kingsway/Upper Lisburn Road, Belfast
 St Anthony's, Willowfield, Woodstock Road, Belfast
 St Bernadette's, Rosetta Road, Castlereagh
 St Brigid's, Malone Road, Belfast
 St Colmcille's, Upper Newtownards Road, Belfast
 St Gerard's, Antrim Road, Belfast
 St John's, Falls Road, Belfast
 St Luke's, Twinbrook
 St Malachy's, Alfred Street, Belfast
 St Mary's, Chapel Lane, Belfast
 St Mary's-On-The-Hill, Glengormley
 St Matthew's, Bryson Street, Belfast
 St Michael The Archangel, Finaghy Road North, Belfast
 St Oliver Plunkett, Glenveagh Drive, Glen Road, Belfast
 St Paul's, Falls Road, Belfast
 St Teresa's, Glen Road, Belfast
 St. Therese of Lisieux, Somerton Road, Belfast
 St Vincent De Paul, Ligoniel

Country parishes 
Listed are country parishes listed by the Diocese of Down and Connor.

 Aghagallon & Ballinderry (St Patrick's)
 Ahoghill (St Marys Church; Ballynafie Road, Ahoghill)
 Antrim (St Comgall's and St Joseph's)
 Armoy (St. Olcan's)
 Ballintoy (St Mary's and St Joseph's)
 Ballycastle (St Patrick's & St Brigid's) 
 Ballyclare & Ballygowan (Sacred Heart)
 Ballygalget (St Patrick's Church)
 Ballymena/Kirkinriola (All Saints and St Patrick's)
 Ballymoney & Derrykeighan (Our Lady & St Patrick's)
 Bangor (St Comgall's, Bangor; Most Holy Redeemer, Ballyholme; St Comgall's, Donaghadee)
 Carnlough (St John the Evangelist)
 Carrickfergus (St Nicholas')
 Castlewellan (under the patronage of St Malachy]
 Coleraine
 Crossgar
 Culfeightrin (Ballyvoy)
 Cushendall (St Patrick's) & Cushendun (St Patrick's, Craigagh & St Mary's "Star of the Sea", Culraney)
 Downpatrick (St Patrick’s, Downpatrick; St Malachy’s, Ballykilbeg; St Brigid’s, Rathkeltair; St Colmcille’s)
 Drumaroad & Clanvaraghan (St John the Baptist; Our Lady of the Angels)
 Dundrum & Tyrella
 Duneane (Moneyglass & Toome)
 Dunloy & Cloughmills
 Dunsford & Ardglass (St Nicholas’, Ardglass; St Mary’s, Dunsford)
 Glenariff
 Glenarm
 Glenavy & Killead 
 Glenravel & The Braid
 Holywood
 Kilcoo (St Malachy’s)
 Killough (St Patrick’s, Legamaddy; St Joseph’s, Killough; Star of the Sea, Rossglass)
 Killyleagh
 Kircubbin
 Larne
 Lisburn (under the patronage of St Patrick) 
 Loughguile 
 Loughinisland (St Macartan’s)
 Lower Mourne
 Newcastle/Maghera (Our Lady of the Assumption, Newcastle; St Patrick's, Bryansford)
 Newtownards & Comber (St Patrick's Newtownards; Our Lady of the Visitation, Comber)
 Portaferry (St Patrick’s, Ballyphilip;  St Cooey’s, Portaferry)
 Portglenone (Blessed Virgin Mary Immaculate)
 Portrush (St Patrick's)
 Portstewart (St Mary's Star of the Sea)
 Randalstown (St MacNissi's)
 Rasharkin (St Mary's)
 Saintfield & Carrickmannon
 Saul & Ballee (St Patrick's, Saul; St Joseph's, Downpatrick; St Tassach's, Carlin)
 Strangford (Star of the Sea)
Upper Mourne

Ad limina visit 2006 
Bishop Patrick Walsh, Bishop Anthony Farquhar and Bishop Donal McKeown met with Pope Benedict XVI on the first morning of their visit. They spoke with the Pope for 20 minutes privately in which they discussed things like education, child sexual abuse, peace and reconciliation in Northern Ireland.

Ad limina visit 2017 

Bishop Treanor joined other Irish bishops in February 2017 for the ad limina visit. Unlike previous visits there were no private meetings with diocesan bishops and Pope Francis, rather the Pontiff spoke with the bishops together.

Previous bishops
Ordinaries

The following is a basic list of the Roman Catholic bishops and vicars apostolic.

 John Fossade (1442–1450)
 Thomas Knight. O.S.B. (1453–1469)
 Tadhg Ó Muirgheasa (1469–1480)
 Tiberio Ugolino (1483–1519)
 Robert Blyth, O.S.B. (1520–1539)
 Eugene Magennis (1539–1559)
 Miler Magrath, O.F.M. (1565–1580)
 Donat O'Gallagher, O.F.M. (1580–1581)
 Bl. Conor O'Devany, O.F.M. (1582–1612)
 (Patrick Hanratty, vicar apostolic, 1614–1625)
 Edmund Dungan (1625–1629)
 Hugh Magennis, O.F.M. (1630–1640)
 (See vacant, 1640–1642)
 Heber MacMahon (1642–1643)
 Arthur Magennis, O.Cist. (1647–1653)
 (Michael O'Beirn, vicar apostolic, 1657–1670)
 Daniel Mackey (1671–1673)
 (See vacant, 1673–1711)
 (Terence O'Donnelly, vicar apostolic, 1711–unknown)
 James O'Shiel, O.F.M. (1717–1724)
 John Armstrong (1727–1739)
 Francis Stuart, O.F.M. (1740–1749)
 Edmund O'Doran (1751–1760)
 Theophilus MacCartan (1760–1778)
 Hugh MacMullan (1779–1794)
 Patrick MacMullan (1794–1824)
 William Crolly (1825–1835)
 Cornelius Denvir (1835–1865)
 Patrick Dorrian (1865–1885)
 Patrick MacAlister (1886–1895)
 Henry Henry (1895–1908)
 John Tohill (1908–1914)
 Joseph MacRory (1915–1928)
 Daniel Mageean (1929–1962)
 William Philbin (1962–1982)
 Cahal Brendan Daly (1982–1990)
 Patrick Joseph Walsh (1991–2008)
 Noel Treanor (2008–2022)

Auxiliary bishops

 Patrick Dorrian (1860–1865) (coadjutor)
 Patrick Walsh (May 1983 – 1991)
 Anthony Farquhar (May 1983 – December 2015)
 Michael Dallat (1993–2000)
 Donal McKeown (2001–2014)

See also
Diocese of Down and Dromore (Church of Ireland)
Diocese of Connor (Church of Ireland)
Roman Catholicism in Ireland
List of Roman Catholic dioceses in Northern Ireland
Apostolic Nuncio to Ireland

References

External links
 Diocese of Down and Connor (GCatholic.org)
 Catholic-Hierarchy.org – Diocese Profile
 Profile from NewAdvent.org – info from Catholic Encyclopedia

 
1439 establishments in Ireland
Roman Catholic dioceses established in the 15th century
Religion in County Antrim
Religion in County Down
Religion in County Londonderry
Roman Catholic Ecclesiastical Province of Armagh